Ralph Thompson Morgan (died 31 March 1949) was an organist and author based in England.

Life

He studied organ at Norwich Cathedral under Dr. Frank Bates.

Appointments

Organist of Christ Church, Dorchester 1891 - 1893
Organist of St. Andrew's Church, Hingham, Norfolk 1893 - 1895
Organist of St. Mary the Virgin, Hayes, Kent 1895 - 1906 
Organist of St Mary Redcliffe 1906 - 1949
Organist of Colston Hall, Bristol

Publications

He wrote 
St Mary Redcliffe, Bristol, A short Guide
St Mary Redcliffe, A short account of its organs, etc.

References

1876 births
1949 deaths
English organists
British male organists
English composers
Fellows of the Royal College of Organists